Bill Houston (14 August 1918 – 25 November 1982) was  a former Australian rules footballer who played with Footscray in the Victorian Football League (VFL).

Notes

External links 
		

1918 births
1982 deaths
Australian rules footballers from Victoria (Australia)
Western Bulldogs players